This is a list of flags used in Bangladesh. For more information about the national flag, visit the article Flag of Bangladesh.

National flag

Government flags

Civil Ensign

Military flags

Police & Civil Defense Flags

Bangladesh Scouts

Historical flags

Political flags

Separatist rebel movements

See also 

 Emblem of Bangladesh
 National symbols of Bangladesh

References 

Lists and galleries of flags
Flags
Flags